Conta conta, the Conta catfish, is a species of South Asian river catfish.  This species grows to a length of  TL.

Distribution and habitat
C. conta is distributed in the Ganges and Brahmaputra drainages, India and Bangladesh. C. conta is also listed to originate from Bhareli and Mahananda Rivers, northeast Bengal, Garo Hills, Meghalaya; and Bangladesh; and also Sarda River, Uttar Pradesh.  This species occurs in rocky streams at the bases of hills.

References 
 

Erethistidae
Fish of Asia
Fish of India
Fish of Bangladesh
Taxa named by Francis Buchanan-Hamilton
Fish described in 1822